The Mexican angelshark (Squatina mexicana) is a species of angelshark.

References

Mexican angelshark
Fish of Mexico
Fish of the Gulf of Mexico
Mexican angelshark
Taxobox binomials not recognized by IUCN